Korean unionism may refer to
Trade unions in North Korea
General Federation of Trade Unions of Korea, the sole legal trade union in North Korea
Trade unions in South Korea
The Korean reunification movement